The badminton women's team tournament at the 2018 Asian Games in Jakarta took place from 19 to 22 August at Istora Gelora Bung Karno.

The draw for the team event was held on 16 August. China team was the reigning champion after winning the gold medal in Incheon and Japan led the seeding.

Mongolia withdrew from this event.

Japan won the gold medal defeating second seed China 3–1 in the final, Indonesia and Thailand shared the bronze medal after losing in the semi-finals. 
Akane Yamaguchi lost the first match to Chen Yufei from China 21–15 21–12. In the next bout, Yuki Fukushima and Sayaka Hirota beat Chen Qingchen and Jia Yifan 21–12, 21–17, to make the team result 1–1. Nozomi Okuhara made it 2–1 for Japan after she beat He Bingjiao 21–16, 19–21, 21–15. There was no such drama in the last match when Misaki Matsutomo and Ayaka Takahashi beat Huang Dongping and Zheng Yu 21–16, 21–11.

Schedule
All times are Western Indonesia Time (UTC+07:00)

Results

Round of 16

Quarterfinals

Semifinals

Gold medal match

Non-participating athletes

References

External links
Schedule

Badminton at the 2018 Asian Games